The 2020 ASUN men's basketball tournament is the conference postseason tournament for the ASUN Conference. The tournament is the 41st year the league has conducted a postseason tournament. The tournament will be held March 3, 5, and 8, 2020 at campus sites of the higher seeds. The winner receives the conference's automatic bid to the NCAA tournament.

Seeds
The top eight teams in the conference standings qualify for the tournament. The teams are seeded by record in conference, with a tiebreaker system to seed teams with identical conference records. 

The two tiebreakers used by the ASUN are: 1) head-to-head record of teams with identical record and 2) NCAA NET Rankings available on day following the conclusion of ASUN regular season play.

Schedule

Bracket

Game Summaries

Quarterfinals

Semifinals

Championship

References

Tournament
ASUN men's basketball tournament
ASUN men's basketball tournament